Platanos (Greek: Πλάτανος meaning plane tree) is a village and a community in the municipality of Ancient Olympia, Elis, Greece. It is located north of the Alfeios valley, 2 km southeast of Pelopio, 3 km northwest of Olympia and 15 km east of Pyrgos. The Greek National Road 74 (Pyrgos - Tripoli) passes south of Platanos. In 2011 Platanos had a population of 766 for the village, and 780 for the community, which includes the small village Agios Georgios.

Population

See also

List of settlements in Elis

References

External links

 

Populated places in Elis